Two ships in the United States Navy have been named USS Drayton for Percival Drayton.

  was a  launched in 1910 and decommissioned in 1919 after service in World War I
  was a  launched in 1936 and decommissioned by 1945 after service in World War II

United States Navy ship names